Power FC is a Ghanaian professional football club based in Koforidua, Eastern Region. The club is competing in the Ghana Division Two League.

History
The club was first promoted to the Ghana Premier League in 1997–1998. They finished third from bottom in 2000, and were relegated after losing to Adansiman Obuasi in a play-off. However, they were promoted back to the Ghana Premier League in their first season back in Division One. After finishing third from bottom again, they retained their place in the top flight after beating Mysterious Dwarfs 1–0. However, they were relegated again after finishing bottom in 2006–2007.

Squad

Former coaches
Ebo Mends

References

Football clubs in Ghana
Koforidua